Antony Hickling (born 8 November 1975) is an English Independent film maker, actor and writer. He became a French citizen in 2018.

Biography
Antony Hickling was born in South Africa, Johannesburg the son of an Indian father and English mother. At a young age he returned to the United Kingdom and the family settled in Greater Manchester where he trained as an actor at Manchester University (The Arden School of Theatre). He then moved to Paris, France and left his doctorate in Performing arts unfinished  to pursue a career in cinema. He went on to direct films related to his research on Queer.  
His films have been screened at LGBTQ film festivals worldwide. He continues to work as an actor.

Films
Hickling's films are characterized by religious symbolism, metaphor and explicit sexual representations, often blending the boundaries between surrealism and realism.  His style intertwines theatrical genres, freely crossing from drama to dance and transcending traditions of individual forms. The work incorporates performance art, poetry and painting. The Trilogy of films : Little Gay Boy, Where Horses Go To Die and Frig are of an autobiographical nature and Frig marks the end of what Hickling has called the first chapter.
With his next film Down in Paris he moves towards a more traditional narrative style and the film illustrates the beginning of a new phase in the directors work.

Selected filmography

Actor 
2021  Down in Paris by Antony Hickling
2021  The Biggest Fan by Philippe Guillard 
2021  The Butcher’s Daughter by Christopher Thompson (actor)
2016 Louise by the Shore by Jean-François Laguionie
2015 Long Way North by Rémi Chayé
2010 Heavy Rain by Quantic Dream 
2010 Arthur 3: The War of the Two Worlds by Luc Besson
2008 8th Wonderland by Nicolas Alberny & Jean Mach

Director 
 An afternoon with Patrick Sarfati (documentary) (2023) (75min) 
 Down in Paris (2021) (102min)
 Frig  (2018) (60min)
 Where Horses Go To Die (2016) (67min) 
 One Deep Breath (2014) (56min)
 Little Gay Boy (2013) (73min)

Film Festival Focus, Jury & Conference 
Jury, TGLFF, Torino Gay and Lesbian Film Festival, Italy 2015
Jury & Focus, Timi Shorts- Timișoara, Romania 2015
Jury, Chéries-Chéris Paris, France 2012
Jury, Serile Filmului Gay International Film Festival 2012, Cluj-Napoca, Romania.
Round table discussion with Randal Kleiser, about the current state of contemporary LGBTQI cinéma for the Champs-Élysées Film Festival, Paris Paris 2017
 Focus on his work at BIG!ff – Bari International Gender film festival Italy 2018, sponsored by Apulia Film Commission Italy.
 Focus on his work at Rio Festival de Gênero & Sexualidade no Cinema 2018 
 Focus on his work at the festival cultural de diversidad sexual y género, Cuernavaca, Mexico 2018. 
 Focus on his work at Chéries-Chéris MK2, Paris, France 2018 
 Hybrida [GeSex#1] International colloquium on gender and sexuality perspectives in contemporary Francophone artistic-literary creation University of Valencia 2018
 Focus on his work at Queer Zagreb, Perforacije Festival Zagreb, Croatia 2019
 Jury, Sadique-master film festival, Paris 2019
 Focus on his work at The IV DIGO – Goias Sexual diversity and gender international Film Festival, Brazil 2019. 
 Focus on his work for Semana Rainbow, A Universidade Federal de Juiz de Fora (UFJF), Brasil 2019 
 Carte Blanche for the 25th edition of L'Etrange Film Festival, Forum des Images, Paris, France 2019
 Retrospective & Masterclass at The International Queer Film Festival Merlinka or Merlinka festival, Belgrade, Serbia 2019 
Jury & Masterclass, Zinegoak, Bilbao International Film Festival (Basque Country) Spain, 2020
 Retrospective TLVFest, Tel Aviv's International LGBT Film Festival, Israel, Sept 2020.
Jury, The International Queer Film Festival Merlinka or Merlinka festival, Belgrade, Serbia 2021
Jury, image+nation culture queer Image+Nation, 35th Edition, Montreal, Canada, Nov 2022

Awards
 Down in Paris wins: Best Director, Queer international Film Festival, Playa del Carmen, Mexico, Nov 2022 
 Down in Paris wins: Best Director for a Feature Film (International), Yellowstone International Film Festival, New Delhi, India, October 2022 
 Antony Hickling for Down in Paris wins The Kim Renders Memorial Award for Outstanding Performance Reelout Queer Film Festival, Canada, Feb 2022
 Down in Paris wins season award nomination for Best Feature Live Action Narrative | Manchester Lift-Off, UK, 2022
 Down in Paris obtained the Arthouse Recommendation from the French Association of Arthouse Cinemas on 24 Feb 2022.
 Down in Paris wins Best Narrative Feature for the 39th Reeling: The Chicago LGBTQ+ International Film Festival OCT 2021
The Trilogy (Little Gay Boy, Where Horses Go To Die & Frig) receives the Christian Petermann award for an innovative work. Controversial scenarios expressed through music, dance and daring at the IV DIGO – Goias Sexual diversity and gender international Film Festival, Brazil, 2019
One Deep Breath – Best experimental feature at Zinegoak film festival in Bilboa, Spain, 2015
Special Mention for his work as a director at Rio FICG, Brazil, 2015 
Holy Thursday (The Last supper) – Special mention from the Jury. Chéries-Chéris, France, 2013

References

Living people
LGBT film directors
English directors
English male film actors
English gay actors
1975 births
21st-century LGBT people